, is a Japanese academic.

Career
He is a professor at Nagoya University.

He is known for scholarly work in ancient and medieval Japanese manuscripts.

Selected works
In a statistical overview derived from writings by and about Yasurō Abe, OCLC/WorldCat encompasses roughly 40+ works in 50+ publications in 2 languages and 200+ library holdings.

 因緣抄 (1988)
 湯屋の皇后 : 中世の性と聖なるもの  (1998)
 守覚法親王と仁和寺御流の文献学的研究 (1998)
 聖者の推参: 中世の声とヲコなるもの by 阿部泰郎 (2001)
 伝記験記集 (2004)
 類聚神祇本源 by 村松家行 (2004)
 法儀表白集 (2005)
 伊勢神道集 (2005)
 中世先徳著作集 (2006)
 性霊集注 (2007)

Articles
 . Kokugo to kokubungaku (1987) 64.5: 72–85

Notes

Historians of Japan
Japanese Japanologists
Living people
1953 births
Academic staff of Nagoya University